Giro is a U.S. manufacturer of snow and cycling helmets; snow and mountain-biking goggles; cycling and mountain bike apparel and shoes; and softgoods for cycling, skiing and snowboarding. The company was founded in 1985 by Jim Gentes and is headquartered in the Scotts Valley, California area.  It was acquired by Bell Sports in 1996.

Giro is part of Vista Outdoor.

References

External links

 

Clothing companies established in 1985
Cycle parts manufacturers
Companies based in Santa Cruz County, California
American companies established in 1985